The 2005 AF2 season was the sixth season of the AF2. It was preceded by 2004 and succeeded by 2006. The league champions were the Memphis Xplorers, who defeated the Louisville Fire in ArenaCup VI.

League info

Standings

 Green indicates clinched playoff berth
 Purple indicates division champion
 Grey indicates best regular season record

Playoffs

ArenaCup VI

ArenaCup VI was the 2005 edition of the AF2's championship game, in which the National Conference Champions Memphis Xplorers defeated the American Conference Champions Louisville Fire in Bossier City, Louisiana by a score of 63 to 41.

External links
 2005 af2 season
 Arena Cup VI Stats

Af2 seasons